William McCammond was an Irish Unionist politician who served as Lord Mayor of Belfast between 1894 and 1896. He was knighted in 1895 and died in 1898. McCammond was active in trying to resolve the Belfast and Clyde shipbuilders' crisis of 1895 .

References

External links
Portrait of William McCammond

1898 deaths
Lord Mayors of Belfast
Year of birth missing